Crossenville is an unincorporated community in Perry County, in the U.S. state of Ohio.

History
William Crossen founded Crossenville in 1817, and named it for himself. The Crossenville post office closed in 1905.

References

Unincorporated communities in Perry County, Ohio
Unincorporated communities in Ohio
1817 establishments in Ohio
Populated places established in 1817